2/10 may refer to:
February 10 (month-day date notation)
October 2 (day-month date notation)
2nd Battalion, 10th Marines, an artillery battalion of the United States Marine Corps